Garbage & Noel Gallagher's High Flying Birds: Live in Concert is a co-headline concert tour by American alternative rock band Garbage and British alternative rock band Noel Gallagher's High Flying Birds. The North American tour consists of twenty-four United States dates and one Canadian date, with Metric as special guests in the United States dates only. 

The tour was announced on February 13, 2023, with tickets going on sale on February 17. An Atlanta date was added on February 27, with tickets going on sale on March 3. It will begin on June 2 in Auburn and end on July 15 in Boston.

Noel Gallagher's High Flying Birds will tour in support of their upcoming fourth studio album, Council Skies, which will be released the same day the tour begins. It is the band's first tour since 2019, whereas the band toured with The Smashing Pumpkins.

Garbage will tour in support of their seventh studio album, No Gods No Masters, which came out in 2021. The tour comes amidst Garbage work on their yet-untitled eighth studio album, which is due in early 2024, and after the Record Store Day release of their Witness to Your Love EP. Daniel Shulman will play bass with Garbage.

Tour dates

Reference list 

Garbage (band) concert tours
2023 concert tours
Co-headlining concert tours
Rock concerts